Finally Got Myself Together is the fifteenth studio album by American soul music group the Impressions. The album peaked at No. 176 on the Billboard Top LPs chart and No. 16 on the Top Soul LPs chart in 1974.

Track listing
 "If It's in You to Do Wrong"  – 4:43
 "Finally Got Myself Together (I'm a Changed Man)"  – 3:05
 "I'll Always Be Here"  – 2:59
 "Miracle Woman"  – 3:19
 "We Go Back a Ways"  – 3:50
 "Guess What I've Got"  – 3:51
 "Try Me "  – 5:17
 "Don't Forget What I Told You"  – 4:59

Charts

References

The Impressions albums
1974 albums
Curtom Records albums